Baron Avebury, of Avebury in the County of Wiltshire, is a title in the Peerage of the United Kingdom. It was created 22 January 1900 for the banker, politician and archaeologist Sir John Lubbock, 4th Baronet. He was succeeded by his eldest son, the second Baron. On his death the titles passed to his nephew, the third Baron. He was the son of Harold Fox Pitt Lubbock, fourth son of the first Baron, who died in 1971. The title then passed to the third Baron's first cousin, the fourth Baron, the son of Maurice Fox Pitt Lubbock, sixth son of the first Baron. The fourth baron was a Liberal Democrat politician and one of the ninety excepted hereditary peers who remained in the House of Lords after the passing of the House of Lords Act 1999. He was succeeded by his son, the fifth Baron, in 2016.

The Lubbock Baronetcy, of Lamas, was created in the Baronetage of the United Kingdom on 9 April 1806 for John Lubbock, with remainder to his nephew John William, the son of William Lubbock. Lubbock was a successful merchant and banker in London. He was succeeded according to the special remainder by his nephew William, the second Baronet. He was also a banker. His grandson, the aforementioned fourth Baronet, was elevated to the peerage as Baron Avebury in 1900.

Lubbock Baronets, of Lamas (1806)
 Sir John Lubbock, 1st Baronet (1744–1816)
 Sir John Lubbock, 2nd Baronet (1773–1840)
 Sir John Lubbock, 3rd Baronet (1803–1865)
 Sir John Lubbock, 4th Baronet (1834–1913) (created Baron Avebury in 1900)

Barons Avebury (1900)
 John Lubbock, 1st Baron Avebury (1834–1913)
 John Birkbeck Lubbock, 2nd Baron Avebury (1858–1929)
 John Lubbock, 3rd Baron Avebury (1915–1971)
 Eric Reginald Lubbock, 4th Baron Avebury (1928–2016)
 Lyulph Ambrose Jonathan Lubbock, 5th Baron Avebury (b. 1954)

The heir apparent is his only son Alexander Lyulph Robert Lubbock (b. 1985)

Notes

References

Baronies in the Peerage of the United Kingdom
Noble titles created in 1900
Noble titles created for UK MPs